is a Japanese internet service provider operated by , a wholly owned subsidiary of Sony.

Timeline 
 November 1995 - The operating company, Sony Communication Network Corporation (SCN) was established as a subsidiary of Sony.
 January 1996 - launched ISP business.
 November 1997 - Released PostPet DX mail software.
 November 1999 - Became the first Internet service provider (ISP) to obtain Privacy Mark.
 August 2001 - started ADSL service.
 September 2001 - purchased WebOnline Networks, the operating company of "JustNet", from JustSystems.
 October 2001 - launched "Harbot" service.
 April 2002 - merged with WebOnline Networks, Ltd.
 May 2002 - started optical fiber connection service.
 March 2003 - started IP telephone service.
 December 2005 - listed on the Mothers market of Tokyo Stock Exchange.
 October 2006 - changed its corporate name to So-net Entertainment Corporation.
 July 2007 - Established MotionPortrait, Inc.
 August 2007 - Acquired So-net Entertainment Taiwan Ltd. as a consolidated subsidiary.
 November 2007 - Relocated headquarters to Osaki, Shinagawa-ku, Tokyo.
 January 2008 - Listed on TSE 1st Section.
 July 2008 - Acquired So-net Media Networks Corporation as a consolidated subsidiary.
 March 2009 - So-net Entertainment Taiwan Ltd. signed a capital/business partnership contract with Chunghwa Telecom Co., Ltd. (CHT).
 February 2010 - Acquired the ISP business from USEN CORPORATION.
 May 2011 - So-Net hacked from unknown IP address. Roughly $1225 in customer's redeemable gift points stolen.
 July 2012 - Established So-net Business Associates Corporation.
 December 2012 - Delisted from TSE 1st Section.
 January 2013 - Became a wholly owned subsidiary of Sony Corporation.
 April 2013 - So-net launches Nuro Hikari, a FTTH service that provides 2Gbit/s internet. Initial markets include Chiba, Gunma, Ibaraki, Tochigi, Tokyo, Kanagawa and Saitama in Japan.
 July 2013 - Changed company name to So-net Corporation.
 April 2014 - Integrated “bit-drive” business, the Sony Business Solutions Corporation IT solutions service for corporations.
 February 2015 - Launched “So-net Hikari Collaboration”
 June 2015 - So-net launches Nuro Hikari 10G, a FTTH service that provides 10Gbit/s internet. The service leads 10G marketing war in Japan.
 July 2016 - Changed company name to Sony Network Communications Inc.
 October 2016 - So-net launches nuro mobile, a mobile virtual network operator (MVNO) operating on the NTT DoCoMo and SoftBank networks.

References

External links 
 So-net
 So-net Taiwan

Broadband
Fiber to the premises
Internet service providers of Japan
Sony subsidiaries
2012 mergers and acquisitions
Mobile virtual network operators
Telecommunications companies established in 1995
Web portals
Web service providers
Internet technology companies of Japan